Hoye is a surname. Notable people with the surname include:

Daniel O. Hoye, American politician
Hal Hoye (born 1957), American bobsledder
James Hoye (born 1971), American baseball umpire
Rico Hoye (born 1974), American boxer

See also
Hoy (disambiguation)